The 1882 Rhode Island gubernatorial election was held on April 5, 1882. Incumbent Republican Alfred H. Littlefield defeated Democratic nominee Horace A. Kimball with 64.78% of the vote.

General election

Candidates
Major party candidates
Alfred H. Littlefield, Republican
Horace A. Kimball, Democratic

Other candidates
Charles P. Adams, Greenback

Results

References

1882
Rhode Island
Gubernatorial